Hanna Alma Beata Ferm (born 23 October 2000) is a Swedish singer. She competed in Idol 2017, where she placed second.

Career 
Ferm participated in the TV4 talent show Talang Sverige 2014, which was broadcast on TV3. She made it to the second semifinal of the competition. Three years later, she participated in Idol 2017 where she made it to the final held at Globen Arena. She ended up in second place, behind Chris Kläfford.

On 2 February 2018, Ferm released her first single called "Never Mine" after signing a record deal with Universal Music. It was written and produced by Jimmy Jansson, Isak Alveus Bornebusch, and ISELIN. In July, she released her second single called "Bad Habit", which was written and produced by Herman Gardarfve, Patrik Jean, Melanie Wehbe, and Hanna herself.

On 16 November 2018, Ferm returned as a guest performer to Idol 2018 on TV4 to duet with contestant Bragi Bergsson.

Ferm participated in Melodifestivalen 2019 in a duet with LIAMOO with the song "Hold You". They had sung together while Hanna was in Idol 2017. LIAMOO had won the competition the year before. On 9 February 2019, in semi-final 2 of the competition, they qualified for the final, where they finished in 3rd place. Outta Breath, which was released as a single in October 2019, was written and produced by Jakob Redtzer, Sorana, William Jerner, and Hanna.

Hanna Ferm competed as a solo singer in Melodifestivalen 2020 with the song "Brave". She performed in the fourth semi-final at the Malmö Arena in Malmö on 22 February 2020 and went directly to the final, hosted at Friends Arena in Solna on 7 March 2020. She ended up in fourth place (out of 12 finalists in total), scoring a total of 94 points. She received a higher score by the television votes (third-most votes) than by the international jury (ninth-most points).

The single Sweet Temptation was released on 12 June 2020. It was written and produced by Dotter, Dino Medanhodzic, and Hanna. It was accompanied by her first music video as a professional artist.

Discography

Singles

Notes

References

Living people
2000 births
Swedish pop singers
Idol (Swedish TV series) participants
21st-century Swedish singers
21st-century Swedish women singers
Talang (Swedish TV series) contestants
Melodifestivalen contestants of 2020
Melodifestivalen contestants of 2019